Bramalea Limited, founded in 1957 as Bramalea Consolidated Developments Ltd., was a Canadian real estate developer best known for its development of the town of Bramalea (Canada's first satellite city) which would later become part of Brampton, Ontario. The company name Bramalea was formed by combining the names of local towns Brampton, Malton, and "lea", the Old English word for a meadow.

The bulk of the new company's land holdings were purchased from Bayton Holdings Ltd. in 1958 and 1959, at a cost of $1.18 million. Bramalea was first listed on the Toronto Stock Exchange in August 1960, and over the next five years, the company bought up properties and property development companies. In June 1976, the company's name was shortened from Bramalea Consolidated Developments Ltd. to Bramalea Ltd. By 1988 Bramalea's property portfolio had reached 40 million square feet of industry, commercial, and retail space, in addition to its giant housing and land banks. The company declared bankruptcy in 1995  as a result of a heavy debt load during the early 1990s recession. At the time of its bankruptcy, it owned office properties across North America in such markets as Toronto, Dallas, and Oakland, in addition to shopping mall properties through its wholly owned subsidiary Trilea Centres which included Unicity Mall in Winnipeg, Yorkdale Shopping Centre in North York, and Scarborough Town Centre.As well as Levittown in Pennsylvania, the great American fleamarket.

References 

Companies disestablished in 1995
Canadian real estate agents
Shopping center management firms
1957 establishments in Ontario
Canadian companies established in 1957